The current rolling stock of the Chicago "L" rapid transit system consists of 4 series of railcars. The oldest series is the 2600-series which was built between 1981 and 1987 and refurbished between 1999 and 2002. The second series is the 3200-series, built between 1992 and 1994 and refurbished between 2015 and 2018. The third and newest series is known as the 5000-series; built between 2009 and 2015, they feature new technologies such as LED color signs, security cameras, new seating configuration, AC motors, and interior LED signs displaying date and time. The most recent order consists of the 7000-series cars that are planned to replace the 2600-series cars, with options for additional cars that would replace the 3200-series cars.

Currently, most railcars operating on the Chicago "L" are DC power only; the 5000-series and 7000-series feature AC motors although the traction power supply continues to use DC.

Historic/retired

Locomotives

Wooden cars

Metal cars

High Performance

4000-series 

The 4000-series cars were manufactured by the Cincinnati Car Company of Cincinnati, Ohio, between 1914 and 1924. They were the first steel cars on the Chicago "L" system. These cars were built in 2 distinct variants, with the earlier, metal-roofed cars being known as "Baldies" (due to their smooth iron roofs) and the later, wooden-roofed cars being known as "Plushies" (due to their more comfortable, green plush seats). The "Baldies" were equipped with 6 doors per car, however the center doors were never used regularly. The "Plushies" were equipped with only the end vestibule doors, but the cars internal structure was arranged to allow for the later addition of the center doors.

These cars were built as the result of several distinct purchases (dates are the date of the order, not the actual production date):
 December 29, 1913: 128 cars: 66 Trailer (non motorized) cars, numbered (4001-4066) and 62 motor cars, numbered (4067-4128),"Baldies", Longitudinal seating (Car 4005 later motorized and renumbered 4456)
 December 30, 1914: 122 Motor cars, numbered (4129-4250), "Baldies", Transverse seating.
 September 1, 1922: 100 Motor cars, numbered (4251-4350), "Plushies", Transverse seating.
 April 2, 1923: 5 Motor cars, numbered (4351-4355), "Plushies", Transverse seating.
 December 13, 1923: 100 Motor cars, numbered (4356-4455), "Plushies", Transverse seating.

The 445 cars of the 4000-series were the last Chicago "L" cars purchased with air brakes.

When the State Street Subway opened in 1943, the older wooden cars were not allowed to operate through it for safety reasons. The only cars available to operate in the subway were the 4000-series, which eventually led to production of the 5000-series and 6000-series cars.

The last 4000-series cars were retired in 1973 after being in service for over 50 years. Cars 4271-4272 are retained by the CTA as part of their heritage fleet.

5000-series 

The 5000-series cars (numbered 5001–5004) were manufactured by the Pullman Car Company and the St. Louis Car Company. They arrived on CTA property in 1947. Only these four cars were ever built. These cars were the first "L" cars to feature the "blinker door" configuration, in which the doors to the train open inward into the car rather than slide horizontally. This door configuration was later used on the 6000-series, 1–50 series, 2000-series, and 2200-series.

The technology for these cars was based on the Presidents Conference Committee streetcar but also borrowed design elements from the North Shore Line's Electroliners. The 5000-series was distinct in that each car was a three-piece articulated unit, the only cars on the "L" system to ever feature articulation. They were also the first series of "L" cars to be wider at the windowsills than at the doorsills to permit more interior space and still provide clearance for station platforms.

They were originally assigned to service on the Garfield Park Branch, precursor of today's Blue Line Congress Branch. They were transferred to the Ravenswood Branch (today's Brown Line) in 1957. The cars were refitted with pantographs and renumbered 51–54 for service on the Skokie Swift in 1964, where they finished their service life. The 5000-series was retired in 1986. Two are preserved: car 51 at the Fox River Trolley Museum, and car 52 at the Illinois Railway Museum.

6000-series 

The 6000-series cars (numbered 6001–6720) were manufactured by the St. Louis Car Company of St. Louis, Missouri and first delivered to the CTA in 1950. 130 were ordered originally with the series eventually totaling 720.

The 6000-series built upon the design of the 5000-series, using PCC technology and blinker doors. Unlike the 5000-series, the 6000-series units consisted of two cars coupled together in married pairs, the first series of "L" cars to be so designed.

A large percentage of these cars were built using trucks, motors, control equipment, seats, windows and other components salvaged from Chicago's recently retired fleet of PCC streetcars.

The 6000 series was in service on all of the CTA's routes except the Skokie Swift. Use on the Lake-Dan Ryan route was however limited to emergencies and during car shortages in late 1969 and during the winter of 1979–80. The 6000-series cars were used by SEPTA on the Norristown High Speed Line during the delays of the N-5 car deliveries. The last of the 6000-series cars were retired on December 4, 1992.

1–50 series 

The 1–50 series cars (numbered 1–50) were manufactured by the St. Louis Car Company of St. Louis, Missouri, and delivered to the CTA in 1959 and 1960. The cars were similar to the 6000-series design, but were double ended, single cars, as opposed to the 6000-series single ended, married pair configuration. The quarter point doors were adjacent to the operators cabs, allowing the operator to collect fares without leaving the cab. Like some members of the 6000-series, these cars utilized parts salvaged from Chicago's recently retired fleet of PCC streetcars.

Cars 1-4 were equipped for high performance test service, with higher horsepower motors, and were delivered in a distinctive maroon and silver gray paint scheme.

Originally assigned to the West-Northwest service, in later years these cars were found mainly on the Ravenswood, Skokie, and Evanston lines.

10 of these cars were converted in 5 married-pair sets and renumbered 61a-b to 65a-b, and were utilized in Skokie service.

The last cars of the 1–50 series were retired in 1999. Seven cars of this series have been preserved by various railway museums.

2000-series 

The 2000-series cars (numbered 2001–2180) were manufactured by Pullman-Standard of Chicago, and delivered to the CTA in 1964. Like the 6000-series before them, the 2000-series was built as married-pair sets. The cars had a number of modern features, including air conditioning, fluorescent lighting, large picture windows and sculptured fiberglass front ends for the car bodies. The car bodies were mainly aluminum. These cars were the start of the High Performance Family.

The 2000-series's more modern control systems initially prevented them from being used in a train with other types, until the delivery of the 2200-series and later cars.

The last 2000-series cars were scrapped after their final service on the Green Line on December 17, 1993.

The 2000-series had a short service life of only 29 years, with most of the cars in the series being scrapped in 1993. Two cars are preserved at the Illinois Railway Museum in Union, Illinois.

2200-series 

The 2200-series cars (numbered 2201–2350) were manufactured by the Budd Company of Philadelphia, Pennsylvania and first delivered to the CTA in 1969, before the Dan Ryan branch (now known as the south end of the Red Line) opened. 150 cars were ordered, and all delivered in 1969 and 1970. These cars were the last to feature the blinker door configuration, in which the doors to the train opened inward into the car rather than slide horizontally. These doors, which had a much narrower opening than the newer sliding doors, were unable to accommodate a wheelchair. Because of this, all 2200-series cars that ran in regular service on the Blue Line had to be coupled with a married pair of 2600-series cars, in order to comply with the Americans with Disabilities Act of 1990. In addition, during eight car operation on the Blue Line, the 2200-series cars were referred to as belly car service (which means that they are not at either end of the consist), with 2600-series cars on the ends of the train.

The 2200-series also featured fluted, unpainted stainless steel sides, a unique feature in the rolling stock until the delivery of the 3200-series.

Cars 2307 and 2316 were renumbered 2351 and 2352; 2351 was originally numbered 2307 and repaired after its mate 2308 was damaged in an accident at Addison station in 1976; 2352 was renumbered from 2316 and paired with 2351 after 2315 was damaged in a fire in the Skokie Shops yard in November 1977. Cars 2289 and 2290 were damaged in the 1977 Chicago Loop derailment on February 4, 1977. After the derailment cars 2289 and 2290 were later retired and scrapped.

The cars were rebuilt by the New York Rail Car Corporation of Brooklyn, New York, from 1990 until 1992, to extend their service life.

Retirement of the 2200-series cars began in October 2010 and was completed in August 2013. The last eight 2200-series cars were retired from service after their ceremonial last trips on the Blue Line on August 8, 2013. The farewell tour of the 2200-series cars took place on a 6 car private charter ran by Eric Zabelny on August 25, 2013 which toured most of the CTA system. Cars 2243-2244 are preserved at the Illinois Railway Museum in Union, Illinois.

2400-series 

The 2400-series cars (numbered 2401–2600) were manufactured by Boeing-Vertol of Ridley Park, Pennsylvania and first delivered to the CTA in 1976. 100 were ordered originally, with an option for an additional 100 (which was exercised and the additional cars delivered through 1978). Retirement of the 2400-series cars began in 2013 after all of the 2200-series cars were retired from service and was completed in October 2014.

The first cars for the "L" to feature sliding doors, the 2400-series also features smooth steel exteriors, ideal for decals and, in many cases, advertisements. As delivered, the cars featured a red, white, and blue color scheme on the front and rear of the cars, as well as stripes along the sides. These were modified several times over the years and the colors were eventually removed from all cars, leaving them unpainted to match the bare stainless steel scheme of the rest of the fleet. Some cars feature advertising and cars 2401–2422 are work cars which are identified by red and white striping along their sides as well as on the front and rear of the cars. (Cars 2423-2424 were converted to work cars some time after 2401-2422 had been converted.)

The cars were rehabbed at the Skokie Shops in Skokie, Illinois from 1987 until 1995.

In the 1990s, the 2400-series cars were used on the Red Line in mixed consists with unrehabbed 2600-series cars. While the 2600-series cars were being rebuilt, the 2400-series cars were used temporary on the Red Line. The 2400-series cars were retired from service on October 31, 2014, with the Orange Line being the last line to operate them. The ceremonial last trip of the 2400-series cars was held on January 21, 2015. Cars 2433-2434 are preserved at the Illinois Railway Museum in Union, Illinois and the cars used for the ceremonial last trip have been preserved as part of CTA's historic fleet.

Current

2600-series 

The 2600-series cars (numbered 2601–3200) were manufactured by the Budd Company of Philadelphia, Pennsylvania, the same company that made the 2200-series, and first delivered to the CTA in 1981, in time for the upcoming O'Hare Airport extension of the Kennedy Line (now known as the northwestern end of the Blue Line). Originally, an order was made for 300 cars, but this order was later increased to 600 cars, all of which were delivered from 1981 until 1987. They were the last railcars to be built by the Budd Company, later renamed to Transit America. The cars were rebuilt by Alstom of Hornell, New York, from 1999 until 2002. They have few features to differentiate them from the earlier 2400-series cars, but nevertheless remain a mainstay of the "L".

These cars make up most of the Blue Line fleet and all of the Orange Line fleet, and car 3458 (originally car 3032) can be found on the Brown Line. In June 2014, as more 5000-series cars were being delivered, The CTA began to transfer the Red Line's 2600-series cars to the Blue Line due to them being newer than the existing 2600-series Blue Line cars, transferring the Blue Line's older 2600-series cars to the Orange Line as an interim replacement for its 2400-series cars until the Red and Purple Lines are fully equipped with the 5000-series cars.

Budd/Transit America had completed car 3200 on April 3, 1987. Car 3200 was not only the final railcar of the 2600-series order, but was the final railcar to be constructed by Budd/Transit America. Once the order was completed, Budd shut down its railcar business.

The 2600-series cars will be replaced by the new 7000-series cars.

3200-series 

The 3200-series cars (numbered 3201–3457) were manufactured by Morrison-Knudsen of Hornell, New York and first delivered to the CTA in 1992. The original order for 256 cars was used for the opening of the Orange Line, which needed new cars when it opened in October 1993. The order was completed in 1994.

The 3200-series contains many innovations over the previous 2600-series. Computers control much of the cab functions and simplify operation for the motorman. Diagnostics are also easier to perform on this series than on previous series. In addition, fluted steel siding is included on these cars for the first time since the 2200-series, in order to reduce graffiti. The series also introduced hopper windows for use in case of air conditioner failure.

Cars #3441-3456 were originally equipped with pantographs for use on the Yellow Line, due to its use of overhead catenary between the Skokie shops and Dempster Street. The pantographs on 3451-3456 were removed in the late 1990s when they were reassigned to supplement the Brown Line, while the rest lost their pantographs when the Yellow Line was converted to third rail power in 2004.

Car 3457 was an additional car built for the purpose of serving as a mate to the 2600-series car 3032, after its mate 3031 had been damaged from a derailment at Wilson station on March 15, 1988. 3032 was renumbered 3458.

The 3200-series cars are currently assigned to the Blue and Brown Lines, composing most of the Brown Line fleet and part of the Blue Line fleet. At various points during their service life a small number were also assigned to the Yellow and Purple Lines.

A mid-life overhaul was completed in 2018 for the 3200-series cars. Plans included replacing the cars' rollsigns with LED destination signs similar to those on the 5000-series, as well as replacing the air conditioning systems and rebuilding the propulsion system, passenger door motors, and the wheel and axle assemblies.

The 3200-series cars will be replaced by the new 7000-series cars if all options are picked up.

5000-series 

The newest series of railcars, which replaced the 2200-series and 2400-series cars, is the 5000-series (numbered 5001–5714). The cars were built by Bombardier of Plattsburgh, New York. The CTA received ten prototype cars in 2009, which underwent testing, and began operating in 2011. The order is for 406 cars, with options for another 308 cars. The Chicago Transit Authority planned to put the first ten cars into in-service testing in mid-April 2010. The first in-service test run was made on April 19.

Originally assumed to be the 3500-series, the order of these cars experienced several delays, including a cancellation of the original bid announcement in 2002.
 Type: 5000-series cars
 Builder: Bombardier Transportation
 Delivery: 2009–2015

New features 
 AC motors
 New LED signs (amber in early production cars, newer cars have multicolor lights for line identification)
 Predominance of longitudinal seating
 The seat fabric will be upgraded to an anti-stain/anti-microbial fabric newly available in the industry.
 Train operators will be able to view live video from any railcar when the passenger intercom unit is activated. This will ensure operators are better able to immediately provide information to first responders.
 Adding cellular modems to railcars will allow the CTA's Control Center to communicate directly with customers in real-time via audio and text messages using speakers and six visual displays in each car.
 In the future, suitably equipped emergency vehicles could also access rail car video through the wireless connection.
 New pulsing white lights and beeping sounds are built into each door assembly, which will activate when the doors are closing.

The 5000-series cars currently make up the entire Pink, Green, Yellow, Purple, and Red Line fleets.

7000-series 

The new 7000-series cars will replace the 2600-series and 3200-series cars and expand the fleet. The order is for 400 cars, with options for another 446 cars. If all options are picked up, the 846 car order will cost $1.3 billion. 10 prototype cars for testing to be delivered in late 2020 and then delivery of the production cars beginning in 2022.  On March 9, 2016, the contract was awarded to CRRC Sifang America, with a bid that is $226 million lower than Bombardier's.  However, on April 12, 2016, it was announced that Bombardier filed a protest of the decision, alleging that CTA rigged the procurement to give CRRC an unfair advantage. On September 28, 2016, the CTA finalized its decision to award CRRC Sifang America the 7000-series contract.

The cars will be built at a new CRRC Sifang America railcar manufacturing plant at 13535 South Torrence Avenue in Chicago's Hegewisch neighborhood. Construction of the factory began in March 2017, with production to begin at the factory in March 2019. The 7000-series tested tracks in December 2019. The 7000-series began testing in October 2020. The 7000-series make up the entire Blue Line fleet. In June 2019, production began on the 7000-series cars. In service testing began on the Blue line on April 21, 2021. Delivery of the production cars began in June 2022. In August, 2022, the railcar production cars began service on the Blue Line.

Concerns have been raised over possible malware, cyber attacks, and mass surveillance by the Chinese government. However, the computer and software components and the automatic train control system will be made by U.S. and Canadian firms.

See also 

 Chicago "L"
 Chicago Transit Authority
 G series (Toronto subway) – influenced by the 6000 series

References

External links 
 
 
 
 
 
 
 
 7000-series Cars. Chicago-"L".org

 
Lists of rolling stock